Yelena Yuryevna Ksenofontova (born on December 17, 1972) is a Russian stage and film actress, Honored Artist of Russia (2006).

Personal life
In 1994, Ksenofontova married Igor Lipatov, but their marriage ended in divorce. In 2003, she married Ilya Neretin, but later they divorced. They have one child, a son named Timofei Neretin (b. 2003). Currently, she in a relationship with man named Alexandr and they have one child, a daughter Sophia (born on February 10, 2011).

In the 1990s, Ksenofontova was diagnosed with brain cancer a few times.

She lives and works in Moscow.

References

External links
 
 Official website of Yelena Ksenofontova

1972 births
Living people
Russian film actresses
Russian stage actresses
Russian television actresses
Honored Artists of the Russian Federation
Gerasimov Institute of Cinematography alumni